The 1987–88 Toto Cup Artzit was the 4th season of the second tier League Cup since its introduction.  

It was held in two stages. First, 12 Liga Artzit teams (without Hapoel Haifa and Hapoel Jerusalem, which were selected to play in the 1987–88 Toto Cup Leumit), were divided into three groups. The group winners advanced to the final group.

The competition was won by Hapoel Bat Yam, who had overcome Hapoel Ramat Gan and Maccabi Yavne in the final group.

Group stage

Group A

Group B

Group C

Final Group

See also
 1987–88 Toto Cup Leumit

References

Artzit
Toto Cup Artzit
Toto Cup Artzit